Freddy Kemayo (born May 6, 1982) is a French heavyweight kickboxer. He is a three-time French Kickboxing Champion.

Biography and career
Kemayo joined Faucon Gym in 1999 and has been training there under Bingo and Richard Roudy ever since. In 2002 he became the French Kickboxing Champion and in 2003 made his K-1 debut in Milan, Italy at the K-1 Preliminary Tournament.

His first success in K-1 came on April 16, 2005 at K-1 2005 Italy, when he defeated Lorenzo Borgomeo and Ionut Iftimoaie and reached the tournament finals, where he was stopped by Alexander Ustinov by unanimous decision.

On February 4, 2008 at K-1 European Qualification Kemayo knocked out Sergei Gur and qualified for K-1 World GP 2008 in Amsterdam, Netherlands.

On May 21, 2010 Kemayo fought at the K-1 World Grand Prix 2010 in Bucharest. In the first round he surprisingly beat the third tournament favourite, Sergei Lascenko in an overwhelming decision. He lost in the semi finals to Alexey Ignashov in a slim decision but the latter damaged his shin during his fight with kemayo so Freddy replaced him in the finals. In the finals he knocked out Sebastian Ciobanu with a head kick.

However in the K-1 World Grand Prix 2010 in Seoul Final 16 he unexpectedly lost by first round TKO to Gokhan Saki after being overwhelmed by punches to the head.

He lost a unanimous decision to Pavel Zhuravlev on November 10 in Craiova, Romania at the SUPERKOMBAT World Grand Prix 2012 Final Elimination, in the tournament.

He rematched Sergei Lascenko in a tournament reserve bout at the SUPERKOMBAT World Grand Prix 2012 Final in Bucharest, Romania on December 22 and won by split decision after three tough rounds.

On April 20, 2013, Kemayo KO'd Dino Belošević in round four at FK-ONE in Paris to win the WAKO Pro World Super Heavyweight (+94.2 kg) K-1 Championship.

He was expected to face Moises Baute at FCK in Tenerife, Spain for the SUPERKOMBAT Super Cruiserweight Title eliminator, but got injured and was replaced with Igor Bugaenko.

He will fight Peter Aerts at Fight Night Saint-Tropez II in Saint-Tropez, France on August 4, 2014.

Titles
 2019 Fight Zone Heavyweight Championship
 2015 I.S.K.A. K-1 Rules World Champion +100 kg
 2014 FK-ONE K-1 Rules Heavyweight Tournament Champion 
 2014 WKF Kickboxing Super Heavyweight World Title +96.5 kg
 2013 WAKO PRO K-1 super heavyweight world champion +94.2 kg
 2011 Fight Code Dragons Tournament runner-up
 2010 K-1 World Grand Prix 2010 in Bucharest Champion
 2005 K-1 Italy Oktagon runner up
 2003 French Kickboxing champion
 2002 French Kickboxing champion
 2002 WKA Amateur World championships (+91 kg) bronze medal
 2001 French Kickboxing champion

Mixed martial arts record

|-
|Loss
|align=center|1–1
|Mickaël Groguhe
|TKO (punches)
|Ares FC 11
|
|align=center|1
|align=center|1:52
|Paris, France
|
|-
|Win
|align=center|1–0
|Xavier Lessou
|TKO (punches)
|Ares FC 5
|
|align=center|2
|align=center|0:54
|Paris, France
|

Kickboxing record

|-
|- style="background:#fbb;"
| 2022-06-24 || Loss ||align=left| Sebastian Cozmâncă || Dynamite Fighting Show 15 || Buzău, Romania || Decision (Unanimous) || 3 || 3:00
|-
! style=background:white colspan=9 | 
|-
|-  style="background:#cfc;"
| 2019-06-16 || Win ||align=left| Gheorghe Ioniță || Fight Zone 5 || Deva, Romania || KO (punch)  || 1 || 0:31
|-
! style=background:white colspan=9 | 
|-
|- style="background:#fbb;"
| 2018-12-02 || Loss ||align=left| Tugay Erdogan || Akhmat Fight Show || Belarus || Extra Round Decision (Unanimous) || 4 || 3:00
|-
|- style="background:#fbb;"
| 2018-07-05 || Loss ||align=left| Cătălin Moroșanu || Dynamite Fighting Show 1 || Bucharest, Romania || Decision (Unanimous) || 3 || 3:00
|-
|- style="background:#fbb;"
| 2018-05-30 || Loss ||align=left| Zabit Samedov || Zhara Fight Show || Moscow, Russia || Decision (Unanimous) || 5 || 2:00
|-
|-
! style=background:white colspan=9 |
|- style="background:#fbb;"
| 2018-02-24 || Loss ||align=left| Igor Bugaenko || |ACB KB 13: From Paris with war || France || Decision (Unanimous) || 3 || 3:00
|- style="background:#fbb;"
| 2017-06-10 || Loss ||align=left| Zinedine Hameur-Lain || Glory 42: Paris|| Paris, France || KO (right hook and head kick) || 1 || 2:35
|-
|-  style="background:#cfc;"
| 2017-04-29 || Win  ||align=left| Imad Hadar || Glory 40: Copenhagen ||Copenhagen, Denmark || TKO (punches)  || 2 || 2:21
|- 
|-  style="background:#cfc;"
| 2016-11-11 || Win ||align=left| Alexander Vezhevatov || Tatneft Cup 2016 final || Kazan, Russia || Decision (unanimous) || 4 || 3:00
|-
|-  style="background:#cfc;"
|2016-10-08 || Win ||align=left| Jan Soukup || W5 Grand Prix "Legends in Prague" || Prague, The Czech Republic || KO || 3 ||  
|-
|-  style="background:#fbb;"
| 2016-03-12 || Loss ||align=left| Xavier Vigney || Glory 28: Paris || Paris, France || Decision (unanimous) || 3 || 3:00
|-
|-  style="background:#fbb;"
| 2015-11-28 || Loss ||align=left| Abdarhmane Coulibaly  || Venum Victory World Series 2015 ||Paris, France || TKO (Leg Injury) || 1 ||
|-
! style=background:white colspan=9 |
|- 
|-  style="background:#fbb;"
| 2015-09-26 || Loss ||align=left| Pavel Zhuravlev || KOK World GP 2015 - Heavyweight Tournament, Quarter Finals || Chisinau, Moldova || KO || 3 || 2:59
|-  style="background:#cfc;"
| 2015-03-14 || Win ||align=left| Emidio Barone || Le Duel des Maitres II || Villepinte, France || Decision || 5 || 3:00
|-
! style=background:white colspan=8 |
|-  style="background:#cfc;"
| 2014-08-04 || Win ||align=left| Peter Aerts || Fight Night Saint-Tropez II || Saint-Tropez, France || TKO (leg injury)||2 || 
|-  style="background:#cfc;"
| 2014-05-31 || Win ||align=left| Yuksel Ayaydin || FK-ONE, Final || Paris, France ||Decision ||3 ||3:00 
|-
! style=background:white colspan=9 |
|-  style="background:#cfc;"
| 2014-05-31 || Win ||align=left| Matheiu Kongolo || FK-ONE, Semi Finals || Paris, France ||KO (Body Shot) ||2 || 
|-  style="background:#cfc;"
| 2014-03-01 ||Win ||align=left| Marcello Adriaansz || Le Duel des Maitres || Paris, France ||KO || 5|| 
|-
! style=background:white colspan=9 |
|-  style="background:#cfc;"
| 2013-12-14 || Win ||align=left| Abdarhmane Coulibaly || Victory  || Paris, France ||Decision || 3||3:00 
|-  style="background:#cfc;"
| 2013-04-20 || Win ||align=left| Dino Belošević || FK-ONE || Paris, France ||TKO (Referee stoppage) ||3 || 
|-
! style=background:white colspan=9 |
|-  style="background:#cfc;"
| 2012-12-22 || Win ||align=left| Sergei Lascenko || SUPERKOMBAT World Grand Prix 2012 Final, Reserve Bout || Bucharest, Romania || Decision (Split) || 3 || 3:00
|-  style="background:#fbb;"
| 2012-11-10 || Loss ||align=left| Pavel Zhuravlev || SUPERKOMBAT WGP 2012 Final Elimination, Quarter Finals || Craiova, Romania || Decision (Unanimous) || 3 || 3:00
|-  style="background:#fbb;"
| 2012-07-07 || Loss ||align=left| Ismael Londt || SUPERKOMBAT World Grand Prix III 2012 || Varna, Bulgaria || Decision (Split) || 3 || 3:00
|-
! style=background:white colspan=9 |
|-  style="background:#fbb;"
| 2012-03-10 || Loss ||align=left| Igor Jurković || Cro Cop Final Fight || Zagreb, Croatia || Ext. R. Decision (Majority) || 4 || 3:00
|-  style="background:#fbb;"
| 2011-11-26 || Loss ||align=left| Vitali Akhramenko || Fight Code: Rhinos Series, Final || Geneva, Switzerland || Decision (Unanimous) || 3 || 3:00
|-
! style=background:white colspan=9 |
|-  style="background:#cfc;"
| 2011-11-26 || Win ||align=left| Yuksel Ayaydin || Fight Code: Rhinos Series, Semi Finals || Geneva, Switzerland || Decision (Unanimous) || 3 || 3:00
|-  style="background:#cfc;"
| 2011-10-22 || Win ||align=left| Mladen Kujundžić || Fight Code: Rhinos Series, Quarter Finals || Moscow, Russia || Decision (unanimous) || 3 || 3:00
|-  style="background:#cfc;"
| 2011-07-09 || Win ||align=left| Orhan Karalioglu || Fight Code: Rhinos Series, Final 16 (Part 2) || Istanbul, Turkey || KO (Highkick) || 2 || 
|-  style="background:#cfc;"
| 2011-05-01 || Win ||align=left| Corneliu Rus || Fight Code: Dragons Round 3 || Budapest, Hungary || KO || 1 || 
|-  style="background:#cfc;"
| 2011-03-18 || Win ||align=left| Sebastian Ciobanu || SUPERKOMBAT The Pilot Show || Râmnicu Vâlcea, Romania || Ext. R Decision || 4 || 3:00
|-  style="background:#fbb;"
| 2010-12-18 || Loss ||align=left| Anderson Silva ||Fightclub presents: It's Showtime 2010 || Amsterdam, Netherlands || KO (Right high kick) || 1 || 1:17
|-  style="background:#fbb;"
| 2010-10-02 || Loss ||align=left| Gökhan Saki || K-1 World Grand Prix 2010 in Seoul Final 16 || Seoul, South Korea || TKO (Referee Stoppage) || 1 || 2:14
|-  style="background:#cfc;"
| 2010-06-04 || Win ||align=left| Petr Vondracek || Ring of Honor || Nitra, Slovakia || TKO (Cut) || 1 || 
|-  style="background:#cfc;"
| 2010-05-21 || Win ||align=left| Sebastian Ciobanu || K-1 World Grand Prix 2010 in Bucharest || Bucharest, Romania || KO (Righ high kick) || 3 || 2:46
|-
! style=background:white colspan=9 |
|-  style="background:#fbb;"
| 2010-05-21 || Loss ||align=left| Alexey Ignashov || K-1 World Grand Prix 2010 in Bucharest || Bucharest, Romania || Decision (Unanimous) || 3 || 3:00
|-  style="background:#cfc;"
| 2010-05-21 || Win ||align=left| Sergei Lascenko || K-1 World Grand Prix 2010 in Bucharest || Bucharest, Romania || Decision (Unanimous) || 3 || 3:00
|-  style="background:#c5d2ea;"
| 2009-11-21 || Draw ||align=left| Xhavit Bajrami || K-1 Gladiators || Pristina, Kosovo || Draw || 5 || 3:00
|-
! style=background:white colspan=9 |
|-  style="background:#cfc;"
| 2009-10-24 || Win ||align=left| Roman Kleibl || K-1 ColliZion 2009 Final Elimination || Arad, Romania || KO (Left knee strike) || 2 || 2:59
|-  style="background:#cfc;"
| 2009-10-10 || Win ||align=left| Erhan Deniz || TK2 World MAX 2009 || Aix en Provence, France || TKO (Ref. stop/broken nose) || 3 || 
|-  style="background:#cfc;"
| 2009-06-26 || Win ||align=left| Alexey Ignashov || 1st Gala International Multi-boxes à Coubertin || Paris, France || TKO (Doc Stop./leg injury) || 4 || 2:00
|-  style="background:#cfc;"
| 2008-12-20 || Win ||align=left| Stefan Leko || K-1 Fighting Network Prague 2008 || Prague, Czech Republic || Ext. R Decision (Unanimous) || 4 || 3:00
|-  style="background:#fbb;"
| 2008-11-06 || Loss ||align=left| Cătălin Moroşanu || Local Kombat 31 || Buzău, Romania || Decision (Unanimous) || 3 || 3:00
|-  style="background:#cfc;"
| 2008-10-11 || Win ||align=left| János Rafiev Afimov || TK2 World MAX 2008 || Aix en Provence, France || KO || || 
|-  style="background:#cfc;"
| 2008-09-12 || Win ||align=left| Ariel Mastov || K-1 Slovakia 2008 || Bratislava, Slovakia || TKO (Doctor stoppage) || 1 || 0:41
|-  style="background:#cfc;"
| 2008-04-26 || Win ||align=left| Cătălin Moroşanu || K-1 World GP 2008 in Amsterdam || Amsterdam, Netherlands || KO (Knee strike) || 1 || 0:35
|-  style="background:#fbb;"
| 2008-03-18 || Loss ||align=left| Daniel Ghiţă || Local Kombat 29 || Arad, Romania || KO (Left hook) || 2 || 2:30
|-  style="background:#cfc;"
| 2008-02-04 || Win ||align=left| Sergei Gur || K-1 World Grand Prix 2008 in Budapest || Budapest, Hungary || TKO (Low kicks) || 2 || 2:53
|-  style="background:#cfc;"
| 2007-12-15 || Win ||align=left| Patrick Barry || K-1 Fighting Network 2007 Prague || Prague, Czech Republic || TKO (Doctor stoppage) || 1 || 1:41
|-  style="background:#fbb;"
| 2007-11-02 || Loss ||align=left| Karl Glyschinsky || K-1 Fighting Network Turkey 2007 || Istanbul, Turkey || Decision (Majority) || 3 || 3:00
|-  style="background:#cfc;"
| 2007-11-02 || Win ||align=left| Koichi Watanabe || K-1 Fighting Network Turkey 2007 || Istanbul, Turkey || TKO (Doctor stoppage) || 4 || 1:50
|-  style="background:#cfc;"
| 2007-10-06 || Win ||align=left| Karl Dubus || TK2 World MAX 2007 || Aix en Provence, France || TKO (Corner stoppage) || 4 || 2:00
|-  style="background:#cfc;"
| 2007-09-15 || Win ||align=left| Luca Sabatini || Kick Imperator 4 || L'Île-Rousse, Corsica || KO || 3 || 
|-  style="background:#fbb;"
| 2007-05-20 || Loss ||align=left| Jörgen Kruth || K-1 Scandinavia 2007 || Stockholm, Sweden || Decision (Unanimous) || 3 || 3:00
|-  style="background:#cfc;"
| 2007-02-24 || Win ||align=left| Peter Varga || K-1 European League 2007 Hungary || Budapest, Hungary || KO || 3 || 2:16
|-  style="background:#cfc;"
| 2006-12-16 || Win ||align=left| Yusuke Fujimoto || K-1 Fighting Network Prague Round '07 || Prague, Czech Republic || KO || 3 || 2:35
|-  style="background:#fbb;"
| 2006-07-30 || Loss ||align=left| Hiromi Amada || K-1 World Grand Prix 2006 in Sapporo || Sapporo, Japan || Decision (Majority) || 3 || 3:00
|-  style="background:#fbb;"
| 2006-05-13 || Loss ||align=left| Bjorn Bregy || K-1 World Grand Prix 2006 in Amsterdam || Amsterdam, Netherlands || KO || 3 || 1:10
|-  style="background:#fbb;"
| 2006-02-17 || Loss ||align=left| Sergei Gur || K-1 European League 2006 in Bratislava || Bratislava, Slovakia || KO (Flying knee strike) || 1 || 2:15
|-  style="background:#cfc;"
| 2006-01-26 || Win ||align=left| Humberto Evora || K-1 Fighting Network 2006 in Marseilles || Marseilles, France || Decision (Unanimous) || 3 || 3:00
|-  style="background:#fbb;"
| 2005-12-16 || Loss ||align=left| Ionuţ Iftimoaie || Local Kombat 18 "Revanşa" || Constanta, Romania || Decision (Split) || 3 || 3:00
|-  style="background:#fbb;"
| 2005-08-13 || Loss ||align=left| Ruslan Karaev || K-1 World Grand Prix 2005 in Las Vegas II || Las Vegas, Nevada || KO (Spinning back kick) || 1 || 1:39
|-  style="background:#fbb;"
| 2005-05-27 || Loss ||align=left| Semmy Schilt || K-1 World Grand Prix 2005 in Paris || Paris, France || TKO (Right kicks) || 3 || 1:19
|-  style="background:#cfc;"
| 2005-05-27 || Win ||align=left| Nobu Hayashi || K-1 World Grand Prix 2005 in Paris || Paris, France || KO || 1 || 2:36
|-  style="background:#cfc;"
| 2005-05-06 || Win ||align=left| Tihamer Brunner || K-1 Slovakia 2005 || Bratislava, Slovakia || Decision (Unanimous) || 3 || 3:00
|-  style="background:#fbb;"
| 2005-04-16 || Loss ||align=left| Alexander Ustinov || K-1 Italy 2005 Oktagon || Milan, Italy || Decision (Unanimous) || 3 || 3:00
|-
! style=background:white colspan=9 |
|-  style="background:#cfc;"
| 2005-04-16 || Win ||align=left| Ionuţ Iftimoaie || K-1 Italy 2005 Oktagon || Milan, Italy || TKO (Leg injury) || 1 || 0:21
|-  style="background:#cfc;"
| 2005-04-16 || Win ||align=left| Lorenzo Borgomeo || K-1 Italy 2005 Oktagon || Milan, Italy || KO (Right front kick) || 3 || 0:44
|-  style="background:#cfc;"
| 2005-02-27 || Win ||align=left| Marc de Wit || "Les Maîtres du Ring" || Tournai, Belgium || KO || 2 || 
|-  style="background:#fbb;"
| 2004-12-11 || Loss ||align=left| Bjorn Bregy || Fights at the Border III || Lommel, Belgium || KO || || 
|-  style="background:#fbb;"
| 2004-04-24 || Loss ||align=left| Vitali Akhramenko || K-1 Italy 2004 || Milan, Italy || Decision (Majority) || 3 || 3:00
|-  style="background:#cfc;"
| 2004-04-24 || Win ||align=left| Gabor Meizster || K-1 Italy 2004 || Milan, Italy || KO || 2 || 1:25
|-  style="background:#cfc;"
| 2004-03-21 || Win ||align=left| Ahmed Jattari || Thai-Box || Tournai, Belgium || Decision || 5 || 2:00
|-  style="background:#cfc;"
| 2003-12-13 || Win ||align=left| Ahmed Jattari || Fights at the Border II || Lommel, Belgium || Decision || 3 || 3:00
|-  style="background:#fbb;"
| 2003-05-10 || Loss ||align=left| Pavel Majer || K-1 World Grand Prix 2003 Preliminary Milan || Milan, Italy || KO || 3 || 2:27
|-  style="background:#cfc;"
| 2003-05-10 || Win ||align=left| Tibor Nagy || K-1 World Grand Prix 2003 Preliminary Milan || Milan, Italy || TKO || 3 || 2:58
|-  style="background:#cfc;"
| 2003-03-01 || Win ||align=left| Arnaud Bonnin || WKBC Full Contact Kickboxing || Saint-Brieuc, France || || || 
|-
| colspan=9 | Legend:

See also
List of K-1 events
List of K-1 champions
List of male kickboxers

References

External links
Profile at K-1

1982 births
Living people
French male kickboxers
Heavyweight kickboxers
Glory kickboxers
SUPERKOMBAT kickboxers